Carlos Eduardo Martínez Canales (born August 1, 1995) is a Mexican professional footballer who currently plays for Cruz Azul Hidalgo.

References

External links
 
 
 Carlos Martinez at Lobos BUAP Profile 

1995 births
Living people
Mexican footballers
Association football forwards
Lobos BUAP footballers
Tuxtla F.C. footballers
Cocodrilos de Tabasco footballers
Ascenso MX players
Liga Premier de México players
Tercera División de México players
Footballers from Veracruz
People from Veracruz (city)
Cruz Azul Hidalgo footballers